Lateantenna is a genus of moths in the family Blastobasidae. It contains the single species Lateantenna fuscella, which is found in western Pakistan.

References

Blastobasidae genera
Monotypic moth genera
Moths of Asia